Proglas (Old Church Slavonic Glagolitic ⰒⰓⰑⰃⰎⰀⰔⰟ, Cyrillic Прогласъ; meaning Foreword) is the foreword to the Old Church Slavonic translation of the four Gospels. It was written by Saint Cyril in 863–867 in Great Moravia (present day Moravia and Slovakia). Proglas is considered to be the first poem in literary Old Church Slavonic.

See also
Wikisource has the complete text of Proglas (in modern transliteration)
Wikisource has the complete text of Proglas (in Cyrillic)
Wikisource has the complete text of Proglas (in Glagolitics)

External links

 Translation into modern English and Slovak
 Translation into modern Nitra language
 Translation into modern Bulgarian
 Translation into modern Czech
 Translation into Interslavic

Old Church Slavonic literature
Church Slavonic manuscripts